The 1988 Lancang–Gengma earthquakes (simplified Chinese: 澜沧江－耿马地震; traditional Chinese: 瀾滄江－耿馬地震; pinyin: Láncāngjiāng-gěng mǎ dìzhèn), also known as the 11.6 earthquakes by the Chinese media were a pair of devastating seismic events that struck Lancang and Gengma counties, Yunnan, near the border with Shan State, Burma. The earthquake measured moment magnitude 7.0 and was followed 13 minutes later by a 6.9  shock. These earthquakes were assigned a maximum China seismic intensity of IX and X, respectively. Between 748 and 939 people were killed; more than 7,700 were injured. Both earthquakes resulted in US$270 million (in 1988 dollars) in damages and economic losses. Moderately large aftershocks continued to rock the region, causing additional casualties and damage.

Tectonic setting 

The Shan Plateau is crisscrossed by strike-slip faults to accommodate crustal rotation of the Sunda Block and deformation as a result of the India–Asia collision, where the Indian Plate is underthrusted beneath the Eurasian Plate. The Shan Plateau formed by uplift along the Shan Scarp Fault Zone, an inactive shear zone and thrust fault along its western base. Located east of the Shan Scarp Fault is the active Sagaing Fault, a dextral transform fault that separates the Burma Plate from the Sunda Plate.

Earthquakes in this part of Southeast Asia (the Shan Plateau) usually display focal mechanisms corresponding to shallow left-lateral (sinistral) and right-lateral (dextral) strike-slip faulting. Shear deformation between the Red River and Sagaing faults causes bookshelf-style faulting which manifests in predominantly dextral faulting within the Shan Plateau. Sinistral systems follow an east–northeast or east–west trend for several hundred kilometers, offsetting the Mekong and Salween rivers. Dextral structures follow a north-west or north-southernly strike. The earthquakes of 1988 were the result of slip along a dextral fault zone.

In 1995, another earthquake measuring 6.8  struck the same area. It left at least 11 people dead, destroyed over 100,000 homes, and damaged an additional 42,000. The earthquake may have been triggered by the transfer of stress from the 1988 events.

Earthquake 

The earthquakes originated along the Longlin–Lancang Fault Zone; a northwest–southeast striking, -long structure. Its northern section is a single strand while the southern section comprises a complex anastomosis of faults. Forming in the early to mid-Miocene, this dextral fault has accumulated  of displacement.

The United States Geological Survey catalogued the earthquake at 7.7 . A small dip-slip (reverse) component was also measured. The first mainshock ruptured an estimated –-long by -km-wide fault zone extending northwest–southeast.

On the moment magnitude scale, it measured 6.9. The rupture area was nearly twice that of the 7.7 mainshock. The event sequence is considered a doublet earthquake.

Right before the first mainshock, a 2.6 foreshock preceded the disaster, it was the only recorded foreshock in the earthquake sequence.

The two events are largest earthquakes to affect both Yunnan Province and Shan State since 1970 and 1912, respectively. In January 1970, a magnitude 7.7 struck Tonghai County, and in May 1912, Shan State was hit with a magnitude 7.8 earthquake.

Earthquake sequence

Aftershocks 
A large aftershock measuring 6.1  occurred 24 days after the mainshocks. It caused additional injuries and further damage. By December 20, over 600 aftershocks had been recorded.

Intensity 

The first mainshock produced shaking which was assigned a maximum of IX on the China seismic intensity scale. It extended northwest–southeast from Mujia to Zhutang Township. Its northeast border lies along the eastern bank of the Heihe River, west of Fubang Township. Landslides, surface ruptures, liquefaction and ground failure were observed.

Intensity VIII encompassed Xuelin Wa Ethnic Township in Mujia Township to the north, and Zhutang Township to the southeast. Within this zone was Ximeng County to the west. Nearly every house in the region collapsed, with very few left intact. The earthquake also caused landslides and ground failures throughout.

Cangyuan County in the north to Shangyun, and Lancang County in the south were within the area of VII. The western boundary also extended into Ximeng County, well beyond the Myanmar–China border, into Shan State. Damage was less extreme although some houses collapsed. Light homes remained intact, and much of the damage to ordinary homes reported include cracking of walls. Landslides, ground cracks and sand boils occurred.

Strong to weak shaking was felt in Thailand, Laos, Vietnam and Bangladesh. In Bangkok, Thailand, people on high-rise buildings felt weak shaking. The evaluated Mercalli intensity in Chiang Mai was VI (Strong), damaging some buildings.

It had a maximum intensity of X. The zone included Gengma County to the north, and Yanshuai towards the south, Tuanjie Township, Cangyuan County to the east, and Mengsheng Township, Cangyuan County in the west. Many houses totally collapsed or were severely compromised in this zone. Many buildings were also seriously damaged. Lightly constructed homes collapsed or tilted due to damage resulting from the rupture. Liquefaction and fissures ejecting water were observed.

The zone of intensity VIII extended from Gengma in the north to Yanshuai and Nuoliang Township in the south. Few homes remained standing and lightweight houses tilted. Damage to the ground was the same as seen in the zone of IX.

Aiguo New Village, Gengxuan Town, Gengma County in the north, to south of the Shuangjiang River in the east, to south of Lancang Shangyun in the south, and west to Minliang of Menglai Township, Cangyuan County in the west were within the intensity VII zone. Adobe houses totally collapsed as a result.

Aftermath 

Seventeen counties were heavily damaged. Many homes, roads and communication lines in Lancang and Mengliang counties were destroyed. An estimated 200,000 buildings including 144,000 houses were obliterated. Over 1.308 million rooms collapsed and 934,800 were damaged. At least 500,000 buildings including 253,000 homes were badly damaged. More than 4,000 essential facilities in Yunnan were damaged. About 1,000 schools, 98 clinics and 29 reservoirs were destroyed. Landslides in the area also damaged highways. The majority of homes constructed of wood and mud, collapsed due to the extreme ground motions, killing its inhabitants. Over  of rockslides damaged highways and blocked rivers, halting water transportation. Kunming, the capital of Yunnan Province, was undamaged, although the earthquakes were felt strongly. More damage was reported in Chiang Rai, Thailand. The total cost of damage is estimated to be US$ 269 million in 1988 dollars (US$ million in ).

Many buildings generally fared well during the earthquake because of better construction practices and seismic retrofitting works conducted prior. Buildings which had survived were built with the consideration of the local seismic hazard. Some buildings including a cinema which was designed to withstand seismic intensity VIII and a residential block made to resist intensity IX were undamaged. These buildings were strengthened before the disaster.

Initial reports from international media stated that at least 600 inhabitants had been killed, mainly in the village of Shanmato which was obliterated. Telecommunication services were cut and severely disrupted. This meant provincial government officials could not provide updated figures on the dead. Earlier figures of fatalities were 18 and 37, which could not be revised due to the communication disruptions.

On November 9, the death toll totaled 938. Chinese officials stated 748 people died; at least 7,700 people seriously injured; over 3 million affected and 267,000 homeless. They added the death toll could have been higher had the earthquakes struck near a city. When the earthquakes struck, many residents were outdoors, which factored in the unexpectedly low death toll. A fatality figure of 938 was given to the United Nations and became widely reported. The reported death toll by the Emergency Events Database was 939.

Response 
Due to its remote location and the lack of communication and damaged roads, rescue and aid transportation efforts faced difficulties getting to the affected areas. The Yunnan government ordered an airlift of medical and relief supplies to help those affected. The governor of Yunnan Province, He Zhiqiang, along with several medical doctors were brought to the disaster scene. Several thousand troops and many military vehicles also visited the affected areas, according to the Ministry of Civil Affairs. Much information about the earthquakes and its devastation were hidden by the Chinese government as the country was going through major political and cultural revolutions at the time. In the early decades of China's communist regime, the guideline was that natural disasters and accidents would not be disclosed unless foreign nationals were involved. It was only in the few years prior to 1988 were these events publicized. At a press conference following the earthquakes, officials disclosed that a magnitude 7.7 event in 1970 resulted in 10,000 deaths.

See also 
 1976 Longling earthquake
 List of earthquakes in 1988
 List of earthquakes in China
 List of earthquakes in Myanmar
 List of earthquakes in Yunnan
 List of earthquakes in Thailand

References

External links
 Aftershocks M4.0 or greater from 1988 to 2000 (USGS)
 (First event)
 (Second event)

Earthquakes in Myanmar
1988 earthquakes
Earthquakes in China
1988 disasters in China
November 1988 events in Asia
Earthquakes in Yunnan
Earthquakes in Thailand
Lancang Lahu Autonomous County
Doublet earthquakes
1988 in Burma
China–Myanmar border
1988 disasters in Myanmar